Ian Howard Marshall (12 January 1934 – 12 December 2015) was a Scottish New Testament scholar. He was Professor Emeritus of New Testament Exegesis at the University of Aberdeen, Scotland. He was formerly the chair of the Tyndale Fellowship for Biblical and Theological Research; he was also president of the British New Testament Society and chair of the Fellowship of European Evangelical Theologians. Marshall identified as an Evangelical Methodist. He was the author of numerous publications, including 2005 Gold Medallion Book Award winner New Testament Theology.

Biography

Personal life
Marshall was born on 12 January 1934. He was the son of Ernest Ewart Marshall and Ethel Marshall (née Curran). Marshall married Joyce Elizabeth Proudfoot in 1961 and had four children. She died in 1996. In 2011, Marshall married Dr. Maureen Wing Sheung Yeung, former president of Evangel Seminary, Hong Kong.  Marshall died of pancreatic cancer in 2015.

Education 
DD, Asbury University
MA, BD, & PhD, University of Aberdeen
BA, Cambridge

Career 
He was Professor Emeritus of New Testament Exegesis since 1964 and Honorary Research Professor at the University of Aberdeen, Scotland. He was formerly the chair of the Tyndale Fellowship for Biblical and Theological Research. He was the author of at least 38 books and more than 120 essays and articles.

Academic interests
Marshall's main interests in research were the Gospel of Luke and the Acts of the Apostles, the Pastoral Epistles, and aspects of New Testament theology. He was particularly concerned with the work of Luke as both historian and theologian. He contributed to a New Testament introduction for students and edited a revision and updating of Moulton and Geden's Concordance to the Greek Testament so that it can be used with the current major editions of the Greek New Testament as well as with older editions. In 2005 his New Testament Theology was the Gold Medallion Book Award winner.

Marshall was a critic of the Christ myth theory. In his book I Believe in the Historical Jesus he wrote that the idea that Jesus never existed has "failed to make any impression on scholarly opinion." His contribution to the UK television miniseries Jesus: The Evidence (Channel 4: 1984) was pitted against that of mythicist G. A. Wells, prompting Henry Chadwick, Regius Professor of Divinity at Cambridge University, to comment that the programmes "juxtaposed perfectly sensible scholarly opinions with opinions so outré and hard to defend on rational grounds that disservice was done to the sensible people by the company they were portrayed as keeping."

Marshall had an Arminian theology. With Arminius, he believed that unlimited atonement is consistent with penal substitution. In Kept by the Power of God (1969), Marshall mentioned the possibility of apostasy. He preferred the view of conditional security for having fewer exegetical difficulties, a point that was added eventually in an epilogue of Kept by the Power of God (1995).

Publications

Notes and references

Citations

Sources
 
 
 
 
 
 

 
 

1934 births
2015 deaths
Academic journal editors
Academics of the University of Aberdeen
Alumni of Fitzwilliam College, Cambridge
Alumni of the University of Aberdeen
Arminian theologians
British Christian theologians
Critics of the Christ myth theory
Methodist theologians
New Testament scholars
Scottish scholars and academics